Christy Carlson Romano (born March 20, 1984) is an American actress and singer. She is known for playing Ren Stevens on Even Stevens and voicing the titular character from Kim Possible, both of which aired on the Disney Channel.

Early life
Romano was born in Milford, Connecticut, the youngest of four children of Anthony and Sharon (Carlson) Romano. Romano was raised Catholic. She began her career at six years old when she was cast in several national tours of Broadway shows, including Annie, The Will Rogers Follies with Keith Carradine and The Sound of Music with Marie Osmond. She made her first feature film appearance in 1996 as a singing "Chiquita Banana" in Woody Allen's Everyone Says I Love You. She also appeared in Henry Fool (1997) and Looking for an Echo (2000).

Career

Acting
Romano made her Broadway debut in 1998 as Mary Phagan in the musical Parade by Alfred Uhry and Jason Robert Brown. In 2002, Romano acted in three Disney Channel projects simultaneously, supplementing her work on Even Stevens with a starring role in Cadet Kelly, alongside Hilary Duff, and voice acting as the title character in Kim Possible. She was nominated for a Daytime Emmy for her work on Kim Possible. The show inspired an adventure scavenger hunt activity at Disney's Epcot which ran for over five years, as well as two Disney Channel movies Kim Possible: So the Drama and Kim Possible: A Sitch in Time.

She voiced Yuffie Kisaragi in the English version of the movie Final Fantasy VII Advent Children, as well as in the Disney/Square game Kingdom Hearts. Throughout her teens and twenties, Romano starred in movies for ABC Family and Disney Channel, including Campus Confidential, Taking Five, The Cutting Edge: Going for the Gold and The Cutting Edge: Chasing the Dream. Various other appearances include MTV's Kaya, CBS's Joan of Arcadia, The WB's Summerland and TNT's Hawthorne. 

In February 2004, Romano began a 31-week run as Belle in Disney's Beauty and the Beast on Broadway. Romano was the youngest actress to portray the character on Broadway. She reprised the role in Atlanta's 2005 Fox Theatre production of Beauty and the Beast. In September 2008, she joined the Broadway company of Avenue Q as Kate Monster for several weeks. She starred as Michelle off-Broadway in White's Lies at New World Stages in 2010, alongside Betty Buckley and Tuc Watkins.

Romano penned a novel, Grace's Turn, for Disney literary subsidiary Hyperion, which received accolades by the New York Public Library (NYPL) as the 2007 Teenage Book of the Year. In 2012, she directed a music video for Steph Gold's "THE SUN" which was accepted into the Los Angeles Shorts Fest 2012.  Amongst other titles, Romano has appeared in many films since her Disney days including Lifetime's Deadly Daycare, Wes Craven's The Girl in the Photographs, Loosies, and Christmas with the Andersons. In March 2016, she directed her first feature, Christmas All Over Again starring Nickelodeon's Sean Ryan Fox and YouTube star Todrick Hall; Lionsgate released the film for Christmas 2016.

Romano appeared as pop star Poppy Blu in the live action Kim Possible television movie which premiered on February 15, 2019. Starting that year, Romano started her own YouTube show called Christy's Kitchen Throwback, in which she would cook recipes with former child actors and Disney stars as guest hosts. In August 2020, it was announced that Romano would host the cooking show Bucket List Bistro for Fox.

Beginning March 4, 2022, Romano and her old Kim Possible co-star Will Friedle began co-hosting a podcast called I Hear Voices available on Romano's YouTube channel and other podcast providers. Among the notable guests have included Eric Bauza, Shelby Young, Kevin Conroy, E.G. Daily, Phil LaMarr, Andrea Romano, Jason Marsden, Dan Povenmire, and Tara Strong. On June 7, 2022, the 20th anniversary of Kim Possible, the podcast had a special episode with creators Mark McCorkle and Bob Schooley and voice actors John DiMaggio (Drakken) and Nicole Sullivan (Shego), as well as a brand new Kim Possible scene with the four actors written by McCorkle and Schooley and directed by original voice director Lisa Schaffer.

Music
While working at Disney, Romano recorded songs as part of soundtracks for Kim Possible and other Disney projects. She first sang on the Disney Channel on a musical episode of Even Stevens which led to more singing on the series and with Disney in general. In 2004, Walt Disney Records released Romano's debut album Greatest Disney TV & Film Hits. After her Broadway run of Beauty and the Beast Romano signed a record deal with Jason Flom at Atlantic Records. Flom was fired before Romano released her first album and Romano's deal was not honored. She continued to write music with Kara DioGuardi and The Matrix and placed her songs in several movies.

Other ventures
After her singing career, Romano began narrating audiobooks, including Pop Princess by Rachel Cohn, The Unbecoming of Mara Dyer trilogy by Michelle Hodkin, and Beautiful Blue World by Suzanne M. LaFleur. She also narrated audiobooks To Catch A Killer by Sheryl Scarborough, Futuristic Violence and Fancy Suits by David Wong, Kaledoscope Hearts by Claire Contreras, and the Adventures of Owl Series by Kristi Charish. On August 22, 2006, she published her own novel, Grace's Turn, for which she provided the narration as well.

In 2023, Romano launched a company called PodCo, a podcast network that will focus on rewatches hosted by the stars of popular TV series such as Wizards of Waverly Place, Ned's Declassified School Survival Guide, Even Stevens, and others.

Personal life
After Even Stevens ended, Romano struggled with depression, self-harm, and alcohol abuse during her late teen years and early twenties. Her experience of playing Belle in Beauty and the Beast on Broadway was taxing on her voice, which was already in delicate condition after she had to have surgery to remove vocal nodules right before her audition. She also admitted that she was pushing her voice past its limit in order to get through her run while trying to make Disney Theatrical Productions proud. Romano later attended Barnard College and received her degree in Film Studies. 

Romano and writer-producer Brendan Rooney met in February 2011 while she was studying at Barnard College. They became engaged in November and, after two years of engagement, married on December 31, 2013 at the Banff Springs Hotel in Banff, Alberta. In June 2016, the couple announced that they were expecting their first child; their daughter was born in December 2016. On August 31, 2018, she announced in People that she and Rooney were expecting their second child, a girl, to whom Romano gave birth in February 2019.

Filmography

Film

Television

Video games

Theater

Discography

Albums
 The Broadway Kids At the Movies (1997)
 Greatest Disney TV & Film Hits (2004)

MySpace Music
Shared Songs (in order of when released):

Soundtracks

Awards and nominations

Notes

References

External links

 
 
 
 
 

1984 births
Living people
20th-century American actresses
21st-century American actresses
21st-century American singers
21st-century American women singers
American child actresses
American child singers
American women pop singers
American film actresses
American musical theatre actresses
American stage actresses
American television actresses
American video game actresses
American voice actresses
Food and cooking YouTubers
Atlantic Records artists
Barnard College alumni
Actresses from Connecticut
Actresses from New York City
Singers from Connecticut
People from Manhattan
People from Milford, Connecticut